Studio 58 is the professional theatre training school at Langara College in Vancouver, British Columbia. The school offers a three-year diploma program for acting students and a three-year diploma program for production students. A Bachelor of Fine Arts is offered with an additional year of study through a partnership with Capilano University. It is regarded as one of the top theatre schools in Canada and the only conservatory-style theatre training program in Western Canada.

The school auditions hundreds of people across Canada but only sixteen students are accepted per semester (there are intakes in both fall and spring). Studio 58 operates a small theatre and presents 4 full-length productions annually as well as a smaller presentation of a student devised show. Professional directors and designers are hired to work on each production, and occasionally guest performing artists. Studio 58 productions are open to the public and reviewed by the Vancouver media.

History
The school was founded in 1965 as a small theatre arts course first held on the King Edward Campus of Vancouver City College, now Vancouver Community College. Led under the direction of Antony Holland the course grew into a full program. In 1970, the program moved to new facilities on the Langara Campus and became known as Studio 58, named after the room number of the original theatre space. The theatre program has subsequently moved into new buildings but the name remains to this day.

In 1985, Holland stepped down as the Artistic Director and Kathryn Shaw stepped into the role. Shaw held the role until her retirement in 2020. The school is now under the guidance of Artistic Director Courtenay Dobbie.

Notable staff
 Elizabeth Ball - Former Artistic Director, Carousel Theatre
 Jay Brazeau - Actor
 Aaron Bushkowsky - Playwriting
 Christopher Gaze - Artistic Director, Bard on the Beach
 Kathryn Shaw - Former Artistic Director; Acting

Notable alumni

 Scott Bellis - Actor, Director
 Brian Drummond - Actor
 Bob Frazer - Actor
 Carmen Aguirre - Actor, Director, Writer
 Lara Gilchrist - Actress
 Kevin Kerr - Playwright
 Jonathan Lachlan-Stewart - Actor
 Kevin Loring - Actor, Playwright
 John Mann - actor, musician
 Kevin McNulty - Actor
 Scott McNeil - Actor

 Colin Mochrie - Actor, Whose Line Is It Anyway?
 Ty Olsson - Actor
 David Richmond-Peck - Actor
 Craig Veroni - Actor
 Jonathon Young - Actor
 Daniel Doheny - Actor
 Mason Temple - Actor
Josh Epstein - Actor, Producer, Writer 
 Juno Rinaldi - Actor
 Sonja Bennett - Actor, Writer
 Jane Perry - Actor

References

External links
 Studio 58 Website Langara College

Education in Vancouver
Drama schools in Canada
Theatre companies in British Columbia
Theatre in Vancouver
Langara College